The 1999–2000 Slovenian Ice Hockey League was the ninth season of the Slovenian Hockey League. Olimpija have won the league championships.

First round

Final round

Group A

Group B

Play-offs

Final
21 March 2000: Olimpija – Jesenice: 5–1 (2–0, 3–0, 0–1)
23 March 2000: Jesenice – Olimpija : 1–2 OT (1–1, 0–0, 0–0, 0–1)
25 March 2000: Olimpija – Jesenice: 4–1 (1–1, 1–0, 2–0)
28 March 2000: Jesenice – Olimpija : 1–2 (0–0, 1–0, 0–2)

3rd place
Slavija – Bled: 3–2
Bled – Slavija : 4–0
Slavija – Bled: 5–1
Bled – Slavija : 2–3

5th place
Kranjska Gora – Triglav Kranj: 4–2 
Triglav Kranj – Kranjska Gora: 3–4

External links
Slovenian league 1999–2000

1999–2000 in Slovenian ice hockey
Slovenia
Slovenian Ice Hockey League seasons